Potanthus pseudomaesa, commonly known as the Indian dart, is a butterfly belonging to the family Hesperiidae found in India and Sri Lanka.
The larvae are known to feed on Axonopus compressus.

References

Potanthus
Butterflies of Indochina
Butterflies described in 1881